Waylon Live is a live album by Waylon Jennings, released on RCA Victor in 1976.

Background
Jennings first gained fame as a live performer at a club called J.D.s in Phoenix, Arizona in the early 1960s. A disciple of Buddy Holly (with whom he toured before the rock and roll pioneer's death in 1959), Jennings and his band the Waylors played many styles of music, including folk, rock, and country, and it was on the basis of his local fame throughout Arizona that he was signed to RCA Victor in 1966 by Chet Atkins.  However, the Texan quickly became disillusioned with the lackluster sound of his recordings, especially when compared to his live shows.  He began demanding the right to record with the Waylors and produce his own records, and by 1972 RCA - regretting the loss of Willie Nelson to Atlantic and under siege from Waylon's new manager Neil Reshen - gave in.  What followed was an unprecedented string of critically acclaimed albums, including the groundbreaking Honky Tonk Heroes in 1973, widely regarded as ground zero for the outlaw country movement.  Reshen also booked Jennings and his band into clubs not known for country music, like Max's Kansas City in New York City.  In the CMT episode of Inside Fame about his life, Jennings recalled that he told the jaded rock audience he was from Nashville and would be playing country music, adding "We sure hope you like it, but if you don't like it you better keep your mouth shut, 'cause we will kick your ass." When met with the audience's reply of "Who the hell are you?", Jennings replied: "I'm Waylon goddamn Jennings."

Recording
In late September 1974, as his single "I'm a Ramblin' Man" was riding high on the country singles charts, Jennings and producer Ray Pennington recorded three shows with the Waylors: one at Dallas' Western Place and two more at Austin's Texas Opry House .  The original LP assembled from these shows is one of Jennings' most highly praised releases and includes some of his most popular songs, including "Rainy Day Women," "This Time," and "Good Hearted Woman."  The latter track had been included on Wanted! The Outlaws with an overdubbed vocal by Willie Nelson and released as a single, hitting #1 on the Billboard country singles chart and peaking at #25 on the pop chart.  The album also contained songs not found on his previous records, such as the Jimmie Rodgers song "T For Texas," a cover of Nelson's "Me and Paul," and Rex Griffin's anguished 1930's lament "The Last Letter."  The album is best known for "Bob Wills Is Still the King", which had appeared as the B-side to his 1975 #1 hit "Are You Sure Hank Done It This Way."  The Wills tribute, which Jennings introduces as "a song I wrote on a plane between Dallas and Austin," took aim at country trends, including the outlaw country movement that he and friend Willie Nelson had done so much to create.  As author Michael Striessguth observes, "It was another delightful example of Waylon's eagerness to poke fun at the highfalutin music industry, in this case, Willie Nelson and the redneck rock thing down in Texas.  It don't matter who's in Austin/Bob Wills is still the king."

According to Rich Kienzle's liner notes for the 2003 expanded edition, Jennings had originally planned on releasing a double album, but the idea was dropped simply because double albums were not considered viable in country music, although they were very popular in rock music.  In 1999, a revised CD version restored the nine extra tracks like Jennings had wanted, including the outlaw anthem "Lonesome, On'ry and Mean," the Kris Kristofferson songs "The Taker" and "Loving Her Was Easier than Anything I'll Ever Do Again," and the Willie Nelson-composed "Pick Up the Tempo."  In 2003, an expanded deluxe version was released that contained 42 tracks taken from the three shows, making it the definitive document of Jennings live sound in this mid-seventies prime.  Jennings is backed by his band the Waylors, including drummer Richie Albright and the legendary steel guitarist Ralph Mooney.  Mooney, who had previously played with Bakersfield singers Wynn Stewart, Buck Owens, and Merle Haggard and had co-written the country standard "Crazy Arms," is in especially fine form on the recordings, with Jennings calling out "Pick it, Moon!" on several instrumental breaks.  In his essay for the 2003 expanded edition of the album, Rich Kienzle notes:

"Moon was the unifier within the Waylors.  His sharp toned, economical style gave the band's disparate musical elements cohesion.  He played exactly what the song needed - no more, no less.  His playing made a greater point: Waylon's sound might have roared more than some purists and old timers might have liked (in that era, a few reactionaries actually felt he was assaulting all that country held dear).  But with Moon riding shotgun, it couldn't have been anything but country."

On Nelson's "Me and Paul," Jennings changes the tag line to "me and Tompall," a reference to his good friend and fellow outlaw renegade Tompall Glaser, and he mentions Billy Joe Shaver by name on the Shaver-written "Willy the Wandering Gypsy and Me". On "Ladies Love Outlaws", he proclaims that "Outlaws touch ladies anywhere they want!" and utters a loud "goddamn" on "Laid Back Country Picker" and again menacingly on "The Taker," a rarity for a country singer on record  at the time.

Reception
Waylon Live hit #1 on the Billboard country albums chart and #46 on the pop albums chart.  Stephen Thomas Erlewine of AllMusic writes, "As one of the great live albums, Waylon Live is nearly flawless, a snapshot of Waylon Jennings at the height of his powers...It winds up as one of the great country records and one of the great live albums, capturing a movement at its peak and transcending it."  Marc Greilsamer of Amazon.com: "When the tapes rolled over three nights in the fall of 1974, Hoss and company were at the peak of their powers - growling menacingly at some times, purring seductively at others - with the steady, sturdy, unshakable rumble of bassist Duke Goff and drummer Richie Albright laying the groundwork and steel-guitar master Ralph Mooney vividly coloring throughout."

Original album track listing
"T for Texas" (Jimmie Rodgers) – 4:03
"Rainy Day Woman" (Waylon Jennings) – 2:33
"Me and Paul" (Willie Nelson) – 3:33
"The Last Letter" (Rex Griffin) – 3:54
"I'm a Ramblin' Man" (Ray Pennington) – 2:46
"Bob Wills Is Still the King" (Jennings) – 3:18
"Pick Up the Tempo" (Nelson) – 3:37
"Good Hearted Woman" (Jennings, Nelson) – 2:59
"House of the Rising Sun" (Traditional; arranged by Alan Price) – 3:41
"Me and Bobby McGee" (Fred Foster, Kristofferson) – 4:46
"This Time" (Jennings) – 4:14

1999 CD track listing
"T for Texas" (Jimmie Rodgers) – 4:03
"Rainy Day Woman" (Waylon Jennings) – 2:33
"Me and Paul" (Willie Nelson) – 3:33
"The Last Letter" (Rex Griffin) – 3:54
"I'm a Ramblin' Man" (Ray Pennington) – 2:46
"Bob Wills Is Still the King" (Jennings) – 3:18
Tracks 7-15 are bonus tracks from the CD reissue.
"Lovin' Her Was Easier (Than Anything I'll Ever Do Again)" (Kris Kristofferson) – 4:08
"Look Into My Teardrops" (Don Bowman, Harlan Howard) – 2:39
"Lonesome, On'ry and Mean" (Steve Young) – 3:13
"Freedom to Stay" (Bill Hoover) – 3:59
"Big Ball's in Cowtown" (Hoyle Nix) – 2:36
"The Taker" (Kristofferson, Shel Silverstein) – 2:12
"Mississippi Woman" (Red Lane) – 2:02
"Mona" (Miriam Eddy) – 3:21
"Never Been to Spain" (Hoyt Axton) – 5:05
"Pick Up the Tempo" (Nelson) – 3:37
"Good Hearted Woman" (Jennings, Nelson) – 2:59
"House of the Rising Sun" (Traditional; arranged by Alan Price) – 3:41
"Me and Bobby McGee" (Fred Foster, Kristofferson) – 4:46
"This Time" (Jennings) – 4:14

Personnel
Waylon Jennings – vocals, lead guitar
Richie Albright – drums
Duke Goff – bass
Larry Whitmore – 12-string guitar
Roger Crabtree – harmonica
Billy Ray Reynolds – guitar, harmony
Ralph Mooney – steel guitar

Charts

Weekly charts

Year-end charts

References

Waylon Jennings albums
1976 live albums
Buddah Records live albums
RCA Records live albums